Comahuesaurus (meaning "Comahue lizard") is a genus of sauropod dinosaur of the family Rebbachisauridae. It was found in the Lohan Cura Formation, in Argentina and lived during the Early Cretaceous, Aptian to Albian. The type species is C. windhauseni, named by Carballido and colleagues in 2012. It had originally been assigned to Limaysaurus by Salgado et al. (2004), but was later assigned its own genus based on the presence of diagnostic characters in the caudal centra, pubis and ischium.

Comahuesaurus is known from abundant material compared to other rebbachisaurids; 37 caudal vertebrae, three fragmentary dorsal vertebrae and multiple appendicular elements, including a right humerus, pubis, ischium and a 113 cm long left femur. In their phylogenetic analysis, Carballido et al. (2012) placed Comahuesaurus in an intermediate position between basal rebbachisaurids such as Histriasaurus and the derived clade formed by subfamilies Rebbachisaurinae and Limaysaurinae.

It shares with more derived rebbachisaurids a reduced hyposphene-hypantrum system, but hadn't yet completely lost said structure; that change would happen at some further point in the evolution of the clade, as it is so far only known to be fully absent in limaysaurines.

References 

Rebbachisaurids
Albian life
Aptian life
Early Cretaceous dinosaurs of South America
Cretaceous Argentina
Fossils of Argentina
Neuquén Basin
Fossil taxa described in 2012